This is a list of television serial dramas broadcast by HBS's Hunan Television in 2012.

Golden Eagle Theater
6 January – 1 July: air from 22:00 to 24:00, nightly (2 episodes per day).
1 July – present: Sunday to Thursday 19:30 to 22:00 (2 episodes per day), Friday to Saturday 19:30–20:10  (1 episode per day).

Golden Mango Theater
Sunday to Thursday 19:30 to 22:00 (2 episodes per day), Friday to Saturday 19:30–20:10  (1 episode per day).

Weekly Prime Theater
These dramas air from 22:00 to 24:00, Friday and Saturday (3 episodes per day).

References

2012 in Chinese television